James Leo "Jim" Dillion (May 2, 1929 – September 16, 2010) was an American discus thrower who won a bronze medal at the 1952 Summer Olympics. Domestically he won the NCAA title in 1952 and the AAU title in 1952.

After retiring from competitions Dillion became an airplane mechanic and private pilot. In his free time he restored planes and cars together with his son Jimmy.

References

American male discus throwers
Olympic bronze medalists for the United States in track and field
Athletes (track and field) at the 1952 Summer Olympics
Auburn Tigers men's track and field athletes
1929 births
2010 deaths
Medalists at the 1952 Summer Olympics
People from Plain City, Ohio
Track and field athletes from Ohio